Lixus cardui is a species of true weevil found in Europe

It was introduced in Australia to control scotch thistle Onopordum acanthium, an invasive weed.

References 

Lixinae